Bush Heritage Australia is a non-profit organisation with headquarters in Melbourne, Australia, that operates throughout Australia. It was previously known as the Australian Bush Heritage Fund, which is still its legal name. It's vision is: Healthy Country, Protected Forever.

It works under three Impact models:

 Purchasing land (see 'Reserves' heading below), assessed as being of outstanding conservation value, from private owners, to manage as wildlife reserves in perpetuity.  
 Investing in partnerships with Aboriginal groups, who are often owners of vast estates. Bush Heritage supports the development and implementation of Healthy Country Plans.
 It partners with farmers to support conservation work and aims to have an influence over 10 million hectares of agricultural land by 2030.

It does so to protect endangered species and preserve Australia's biodiversity. It's 2020-21 Impact Report stated it was contributing to the protection of 11.3 million hectares on its reserves and partnership lands. There were 6,700 Australian species recorded on its reserves and partnership properties, including 226 threatened species.

History
Bush Heritage Australia was founded in 1990 by Bob Brown who purchased two forested properties in Tasmania, adjoining the Tasmanian Wilderness World Heritage Site, to save them from being woodchipped.  He used the money of his Goldman Environmental Prize as a deposit, borrowing the rest and setting up the Australian Bush Heritage Fund.

The organization subsequently developed, first in a small way in Tasmania, before expanding to the Australian mainland, and has grown with the assistance of regular subscribers and other donors.

Doug Humann  led Bush Heritage Australia as CEO from 1997 to 2011, raising its profile nationally. ( he is chair of Landcare Australia.) Gerard O'Neill took over from 2011 until 2018 and Heather Campbell has been the CEO since January 2019.

In 1997 Bush Heritage acquired the lease of Erith Island, an island in the Kent Group, Bass Strait, used for cattle grazing.  It was relinquished to the Tasmanian Government in 2002 for incorporation into the Kent Group National Park.

In 2011 Bush Heritage entered into a ten-year agreement with the Wunambal Gaambera Aboriginal Corporation, the "first long-term agreement in Australia between traditional landowners and a non-government conservation organisation". Many others have since followed. The Healthy Country Plan developed by the two groups helps to manage the Indigenous Protected Area (IPA) within the Mitchell River National Park in the Kimberley region in Western Australia. Bush Heritage now has an extensive Aboriginal Partnerships Program.

Aims
Bush Heritage Australia is striving for the long-term protection of Australia's biodiversity through the acquisition and management of land, water and wildlife of outstanding conservation significance. To do so it focuses its attention and investment on broad 'priority landscape' regions across Australia, selected for a combination of criteria, including the number of threatened species and ecosystems, the number of endemic species, the general condition of the lands, expected climate change impacts and existing staff and resources deployed in the region. Care of Bush Heritage owned properties includes the rehabilitation of degraded land, the control of introduced herbivores and predators, the use of fire as a management tool, consultation and co-operation with neighbouring landowners and traditional owners, as well as with government departments, and the creation of habitat corridors.

Bush Heritage Australia also has a conservation science program led by Rebecca Spindler. They study public attitude towards conservation as well as the conservation of animal and plant species.

Governance
Bush Heritage is run by an independent board of directors skilled in land management and conservation, a number of paid staff and many volunteers. In 2020 Bush Heritage had over 39,000 supporters and hundreds of highly skilled volunteers (contributing over 36,000 hours in 2020-21) who are given opportunities to visit and work on the reserves. Details of income and expenditure can be found in the Impact Report on its website.

Reserves
As of July 2022, Bush Heritage had 42 reserves and was working with 25 Aboriginal partnerships protecting 11.3 million hectares (113,000 square km):

 Beringa (WA)
 Bellair (Victoria)
 Bon Bon (SA)
 Boolcoomatta (SA)
 Brogo (NSW)
 Buckrabanyule (Victoria)
 Burrin Burrin (NSW)
 Carnarvon Station (Queensland)
 Charles Darwin (WA)
 Chereninup Creek (WA)
 Currumbin Valley (Queensland)
 Edgbaston (Queensland)
 Ediegarrup (WA)
 Ethabuka (Queensland)
 Eurardy (WA)
 Fan Palm (Queensland)
 Friendly Beaches (Tasmania)
 Goonderoo (Queensland)
 John Colahan Griffin (Victoria)
 Hamelin Station Reserve (WA)
 Kojonup (WA)
 John Douglas (Victoria)
 Lawan (Victoria)
 Liffey Valley including Oura Oura, Liffey River, Coalmine Creek, Drys Bluff & Glovers Flat reserves (Tasmania)
 Monjebup (WA)
 Nameless Sylvan (NSW)
 Nardoo Hills (Victoria)
 Ngulambarra (Victoria)
 Pilungah (Queensland)
 Pullen Pullen (Queensland)
 Red Moort (WA)
 Reedy Creek (Queensland)
 Scottsdale (NSW)
 South Esk Pine (Tasmania)
 Tarcutta Hills (NSW)
 The Round House (Victoria)
 Yarrabee Wesfarmers (WA)
 Yourka (Queensland)

See also

 Conservation in Australia
 List of threatened flora of Australia
 Threatened fauna of Australia

References

External links
 
 Biodiversity in the Lake Macquarie Region

 01
Protected area administrators of Australia
Environmental organizations established in 1990
1990 establishments in Australia
Environmental organisations based in Australia
Non-profit organisations based in Victoria (Australia)
Organisations based in Melbourne
Nature conservation organisations based in Australia
Environmental charities
Charities based in Australia